The 1926 Ontario general election was the 17th general election held in the Province of Ontario, Canada.  It was held on December 1, 1926, to elect the 112 Members of the 17th Legislative Assembly of Ontario ("MLAs").

Background
The United Farmers of Ontario decided to withdraw from electoral politics after having been defeated in the 1923 election, and most of its MPPs redesignated themselves as Progressives with former UFO Attorney-General William Edgar Raney becoming party leader. Nevertheless, several MPPs, including Raney himself, continued to run as candidates endorsed by local UFO associations.

Leslie Oke and Beniah Bowman were opposed to Raney's leadership as he was not a farmer. They were also opposed to the creation of a new Progressive Party which would not focus exclusively on farmers' issues, so they chose to remain as UFO MPPs. Bowman later resigned from the legislature before the election.

The fracture of the UFO, together with a large number of resignations from MPPs who chose to run federally in the elections of 1925 and 1926, significantly changed the composition of the Assembly:

Redistribution of seats

A 1925 Act provided for the redistribution of the Legislative Assembly into 112 ridings for the election.

The dual-member ridings in the City of Toronto, in effect since the 1914 election, were abolished and replaced by single-member seats:

Beaches was drawn out from York East, and High Park from York West.

There were other changes made to ridings elsewhere in the Province:

 Brant and Brant South were reorganized into Brant County and Brantford
 Bruce West was divided between Bruce North and Bruce South
 Durham East and Durham West were combined to form Durham
 Frontenac and Lennox became Frontenac—Lennox
 Grey Centre wasa divided between Grey North and Grey South
 Hamilton Centre was created from parts of Hamilton East and Hamilton West
 Huron Centre was split between Huron North and Huron South
 London was split into London North and London South
 Middlesex East was split between Middlesex North and Middlesex West
 Norfolk North and Norfolk South merged to form Norfolk
 Northumberland East and Northumberland West became Northumberland
 Ottawa West was divided to form Ottawa North and Ottawa South
 Peterborough East and Peterborough West were reorganized to form Peterborough City and Peterborough County
 Wellington East and Wellington West merged to form Wellington Northeast
 Windsor was divided to form Windsor East and Windsor West
 York South was carved out from York West

A further Act in 1926 merged Simcoe South and Simcoe West into Simcoe Southwest, and divided Cochrane into Cochrane North and Cochrane South.

Summary
The Ontario Conservative Party, led by Howard Ferguson, was re-elected for a second term in government. The principal issue of the campaign was the government's proposal to repeal the Ontario Temperance Act, replacing prohibition with government control of liquor sales. The Liberal and Progressive parties both campaigned against repeal, and one of Ferguson's ministers, William Folger Nickle, resigned from the cabinet and ran for re-election against the government as a Prohibitionist candidate.

The Ontario Liberal Party, led by W.E.N. Sinclair, maintained its 14 seats, while the Progressives won 10. Four Liberal-Progressive candidates were also elected, along with several independents. Oke was the only UFO MPP who was re-elected as such, and he was joined by Thomas Farquhar from Manitoulin and Farquhar Oliver from Grey South. The latter won with the assistance of federal MP Agnes MacPhail. Karl Homuth of Waterloo South was the only Labour MPP returned.

Results

|-
! colspan=2 rowspan=2 | Political party
! rowspan=2 | Party leader
! colspan=5 | MPPs
! colspan=3 | Votes
|-
! Candidates
!1923
!Dissol.
!1926
!±
!#
!%
! ± (pp)

|style="text-align:left;"|Howard Ferguson
|112
|75
|74
|72
|3
|634,635
|55.36%
|5.80

|style="text-align:left;"|W.E.N. Sinclair
|49
|14
|11
|14
|
|197,623
|17.24%
|4.12

|style="text-align:left;"|William Raney
|17
|–
|11
|10
|10
|72,445
|6.32%
|

|
|9
|–
|–
|4
|4
|45,733
|3.99%
|

|style="text-align:left;"|Leslie Oke
|3
|17
|1
|3
|14
|15,417
|1.34%
|19.77

|
|3
|4
|3
|1
|3
|14,794
|1.29%
|3.47

|style="text-align:left;"|
|7
|–
|1
|4
|4
|21,002
|1.83%
|

|style="text-align:left;"|
|6
|–
|–
|2
|2
|19,198
|1.67%
|

|style="text-align:left;"|
|1
|–
|–
|1
|1
|5,861
|0.51%
|

|style="text-align:left;"|Liberal-Prohibitionist
|style="text-align:left;"|
|2
|–
|–
|1
|1
|9,115
|0.80%
|

|style="text-align:left;"|
|1
|1
|–
|–
|1
|2,912
|0.25%
|1.37

|style="text-align:left;"|
|27
|–
|–
|–
|
|96,868
|8.45%
|

|style="text-align:left;"|Liberal-Labour
|style="text-align:left;"|
|2
|–
|–
|–
|
|4,633
|0.40%
|

|style="text-align:left;"|Progressive-Liberal
|style="text-align:left;"|
|1
|–
|–
|–
|
|3,941
|0.34%
|

|style="text-align:left;"|Liberal-Labour-Prohibitionist
|style="text-align:left;"|
|1
|–
|–
|–
|
|2,298
|0.20%
|

|colspan="3"|
|10
|colspan="5"|
|-style="background:#E9E9E9;"
|colspan="3" style="text-align:left;"|Total
|241
|111
|111
|112
|
|1,146,475
|100.00%
|
|-
|colspan="8" style="text-align:left;"|Blank and invalid ballots
|align="right"|6,717
|style="background:#E9E9E9;" colspan="2"|
|-style="background:#E9E9E9;"
|colspan="8" style="text-align:left;"|Registered voters / turnout
|1,805,061
|63.89%
|6.15
|}

Notes

References

See also

Politics of Ontario
List of Ontario political parties
Premier of Ontario
Leader of the Opposition (Ontario)

Further reading
 

1926 elections in Canada
1926
1926 in Ontario
December 1926 events